Akçal can refer to the following villages in Turkey:

 Akçal, İvrindi
 Akçal, Tufanbeyli